Lei Ting curse charms, or Lôi Đình curse charms, are a type of Chinese and Vietnamese numismatic charms, these charms can be described as a talismanic coin as they are often based on Chinese cash coins but can also have round holes instead of square ones and may also be shaped like gourd charms.

Lei Ting curse charms contain inscriptions that request the Taoist God of Thunder Leigong to expel evil spirits and maleficent bogies through a magical spell incantation which usually calls upon Leigong by claiming that the inscription is in fact an order from Laozi himself. In some cases these coin charms request that Leigong should act "with the speed of the law" - “急急如律令.”

Overview 

The name "Lei Ting" (雷霆) comes from Lei (雷) which is an abbreviation for "Leigong" (雷公) or "Leishen" (雷神) who is the god of thunder and one of the officials in the celestial Ministry of Thunder and Storm who could punish on behalf of Heaven, and Ting (霆) meaning "thunderbolts" as these thunderbolts would be used for the destruction of malicious spirits as it is the noise of the thunder produced by the drums hold by Leigong that causes death of the wrong doers. It is not uncommon for the characters Lei (雷), Ling (令, "to order"), Sha (杀, "to kill"), and Gui (鬼, "spirit" or "ghost") on Lei Ting curse charms at both extremes of the inscription to be written in Taoist Fuwen as opposed to with Hanzi characters, and although the religious sects and orders of Taoism usually wish for the meaning of Fuwen characters to remain a secret the Fu characters used for these terms are actually well known. 

The term "Lei Ting curse charm" is a term used primarily by Chinese collectors for these coin charms.

Lei Ting curse charms are an evolution of the ancient Chinese belief that everything is controlled by spirits and evil spirits should be dealt with in the same manner as human adversaries should be treated, in Ancient China a large number of exorcists would roam the streets and throw spears into the air to scare evil spirits away, at the same time human prisoners would have their limbs dismembered and would be openly displayed outside the city gates to scare evil spirits away proclaiming that the same fate shall fall upon them if they dare go into the city. According to Chinese legends Hanzi characters were created by the Yellow Emperor and after "the millet fell from the heavens and the spirits cried at night", this was because legends describe spirits of being afraid of being controlled by "the magical properties of Chinese characters" as described in the Huainanzi. As Hanzi characters were used on amulets magical powers were prescribed to them by the superstitious, during the Han dynasty Chinese numismatic charms started to be worn as pendants to protect its wearers from the influence of bogies and evil spirits. Leigong became one of the most commonly requested Taoist Gods to request for protection.

The ancient Chinese people believed that decrees and mandates issued by the government had absolutely authoritative power over them which expanded their belief that Hanzi characters somehow had magical properties. Taoist exorcists and priests claimed that they could use Hanzi characters and Fu script to make decrees that influence the spiritual world, for this reason the inscriptions of Lei Ting curse charms resemble official decrees and documents issued by the government of imperial China but ordered by Laozi and the person being decreed was Leigong whose job it is to punish people guilty of moral crimes such as unfilial sons or daughter as well as evil entities using the Taoist magic to harm others. The reason why Laozi was selected to be the one decreeing the order was because he was a prestigious figure who had the power needed to enforce said decree. In some cases rather than Leigong Laozi himself was used to either scare away or kill bogies and malicious spirits. Laozi is often referred to as "Taishang Laojun" (Chinese: 太上老君; Pinyin: Tàishàng Lǎojūn) on Lei Ting curse charms, this title was posthumously given to him by the Emperor of the Song dynasty in the year 1013 AD. Like government decrees inscriptions on Lei Ting curse charms would carry phrases such as "quickly, quickly, this is an order" or "respect this command" to emulate them. Some curse charms contain the Chinese character for "dead ghost" as living people are startled to see a ghost and fear seeing them as ghosts are once living people who have died, the ancient Chinese people believed that ghosts themselves feared "dead ghosts" and would be equally startled in the same way humans feared regular ghosts and that charms and amulets that had the Chinese or Fuwen character for "dead ghost" would scare ghosts away.

Lei Ting curses appear on a wide variety of Chinese and Vietnamese numismatic charms such as those containing Taoist "magic" writing, a type of secret script used by Taoist priests which ancient Chinese people assigned magical properties to, charms containing images of various other Taoist deities such as Xuanwu, and other Lei Ting curse charms can have Taoist symbols on their reverse such as the Bagua (eight trigrams). 

These amulets were traditionally bought from Taoist masters and because they were often written in an exotic style and using Taoist "magic" writing, it was not uncommon for the inscriptions to be only readable by the Taoist masters who issued them.

List of magic incantations found on Lei Ting curse charms  

The inscriptions of Lei Ting curse charms are read up to down and then right to left. Inscriptions can contain both Chinese characters and Taoist "magic" writing. Usually these curse charms request Leigong to fight malicious spirits and bogies but Laozi may also be called upon for this task. 

The following inscriptions are found on Lei Ting curse charms:

See also 

 Chinese spiritual world concepts
 Ghosts in Chinese culture
 Horse coin
 Zhengde Tongbao

Notes

References

Sources  

 
 

Amulets
Talismans
Chinese numismatic charms